Hillbrook may refer to:
 Hillbrook, Washington, D.C.
 Hillbrook School, Los Gatos, Santa Clara, California
 Hillbrook Anglican School, Brisbane, Australia

See also
 Brook Hill, Pennsylvania